The 2001 European Team Gymnastics Championships was the inaugural edition of the European Team Gymnastics Championships. The competition formed teams of athletes representing different nations, combining events from men's and women's artistic gymnastics, as well as rhythmic gymnastics. The event was held from May 19 to May 20 in Riesa, Germany. The competition was organized by the European Union of Gymnastics. The event should not be confused with the European TeamGym Championships.

Medalists

See also
 1997 European Gymnastics Masters
 1999 European Gymnastics Masters
 2003 European Team Gymnastics Championships
 European Gymnastics Championships

References

European Team Gymnastics Championships
2001 in gymnastics
International gymnastics competitions hosted by Germany
2001 in German sport